{{DISPLAYTITLE:C6H10O3}}
The molecular formula C6H10O3 may refer to:

 Diglycidyl ether
 Ethyl acetoacetate
 (Hydroxyethyl)methacrylate
 Ketoisocaproic acids
 α-Ketoisocaproic acid
 β-Ketoisocaproic acid
 Propionic anhydride

Molecular formulas